Chah Nu castle is a historical castle located in Ardakan County in Yazd Province, The longevity of this fortress dates back to the Afsharid dynasty.

References 

Castles in Iran